The Crane School of Music is located in Potsdam, New York, and is one of three schools which make up the State University of New York (SUNY) at Potsdam.

Crane consists of approximately 630 undergraduate and 30 graduate students and a faculty of 70 teachers and professional staff in a college of 4300 students and 250 faculty. Crane is housed in the Julia E. Crane Music Center on the north side of the campus. The complex consists of four buildings: two classroom buildings (Bishop and Schuette Halls), three concert areas (the newly renovated Helen M. Hosmer Concert Hall, 1290 seats, the Sara M. Snell Music Theater, 452 seats, and the Ralph Wakefield Lecture and Recital Hall located within Bishop Hall, 130 seats) as well as extensive supporting areas. Located within Schuette Hall is the Crane Music Library, which includes an extensive collection of literature, scores, and recordings. Located within the music library is a MIDI Computer Lab. All four of Crane's buildings are connected underground.

Crane became an All-Steinway School following the acquisition of 141 Steinway pianos beginning January 24, 2007. This $3.8 million purchase included three new concert grand pianos and was the largest purchase order that Steinway had ever received in the history of the company.

History
The Crane School was founded in 1886 by Julia Etta Crane (1855–1923) as the Crane Normal Institute of Music, and was one of the first institutions in the country to have programs dedicated to training public school music teachers.

The school suffered from financial difficulties and in the 1920s Julia Crane petitioned the Juilliard Foundation to purchase the school, which was eventually bought by the State of New York in 1926.

In addition to the permanent faculty, memorable performances by the Wind Ensemble and Symphony Orchestra have been given by such guest conductors as Franz Allers, Nadia Boulanger, Igor Buketoff, Sarah Caldwell, Stanley Chapple, Aaron Copland, Rodney Eichenberger, Alfred Gershfeld, Howard Hanson, Lukas Foss, Thor Johnson, Ann Howard Jones, Jan Meyerowitz, Charles O’Neill, Christof Perick, Eve Queler, Vincent Persichetti, Helmuth Rilling, Adnan Saygun, Gunther Schuller, Robert Shaw, Michael Tilson Thomas, Virgil Thomson.

Select Crane School students also have the opportunity to perform with professional ensembles in the North Country. Each year, The Northern Symphonic Winds and The Orchestra of Northern New York invite Crane students to play in their groups. Many Crane School faculty and alumni are full-time members of both NSW and ONNY.

The Crane Symphony Orchestra
The Crane Symphony Orchestra was formed in 1939, the second-earliest college orchestra in the country after Harvard. The permanent conductors have been Samuel Spurbeck, Maurice Baritaud, John L. Jadlos, Richard Stephan, Christopher Lanz, Ching-Chun Lai, and Adrian Slywotzky.

The Crane Wind Ensemble
The Crane Wind Ensemble comprises the most outstanding wind and percussion majors at The Crane School of Music. The CWE performs as a full wind band and also in smaller chamber groups with varied instrumentation. This group is dedicated to the performance of the finest wind repertoire, regardless of period or disposition of instrumental forces. The Crane band program is lead by Dr. Brian K. Doyle, Director of Bands.

Crane Chorus
The Crane Chorus was founded in 1931 by Helen M. Hosmer. It is composed almost entirely of music majors at the Crane School of Music, and usually numbers between 185 and 200 singers. Principal conductors have included Helen M. Hosmer, Brock McElheran, Calvin Gage, Stanley Romanstein, Rick Bunting, Daniel Gordon, and Jeffrey Francom.

Crane Opera Ensemble
The Crane Opera Ensemble offers students performing opportunities in operatic and musical theatre productions. The ensemble began producing shows in 1924 and several recent productions have been the recipients of national awards.

Two fully staged productions are performed each year. The ensemble also hosts an opera education outreach program. The program brings in large groups of children from local schools to experience opera and engage in post-performance workshops with cast members and faculty. To date, over 4,000 children have participated in the program.

Pellicciotti Opera Composition Prize

Once every four years, the Domenic J. Pellicciotti Opera Composition Prize is awarded to a composer/librettist team developing an operatic work which explores and celebrates themes of tolerance, inclusion or diversity. Winning teams earn a commission and production award with the premiere of their work at the Crane School of Music. The prize was founded by Gary C. Jaquay to honor his life partner Domenic J. Pellicciotti, an ardent fan of opera.

The premiere of the first winners of the Pellicciotti Opera Composition Prize took place in November 2014, with the second cycle completed in November 2018 with the premiere of Tom Cipullo's Mayo.

The following is a list of the winning works:

Mayo (Tom Cipullo), Nov. 2018
In a Mirror, Darkly (Christopher Weiss, Libretto by S. O’Duinn Magee), Nov. 2014
The Fox and the Pomegranate (Matt Frey, Libretto by Daniel J. Kushner), Nov. 2014
A Letter to East 11th Street (Martin Hennessey, Libretto by Mark Campbell), Nov. 2014

Community Performance Series
Crane has played home to the Community Performance Series (CPS) since 1989. CPS brings outside artists in to perform at Crane. Often a visiting artist will also conduct a master class during their time at the school. A pre-concert lecture is also given by a member of the faculty on the evening of the concert.

Notable faculty and alumni
Jonathan Babcock (1991 and 1993) – conductor; Associate Director of Choral Activities, Texas State University
Stephanie Blythe (1992) – operatic mezzo-soprano and contralto
Margaret Chalker - American operatic soprano
Michael J. Colburn – 27th Director of the United States Marine Band
Daniel Decker – composer and recording artist
Renée Fleming (1981) – operatic soprano
Stacey Fox (1987 and 1989) - percussionist, composer, filmmaker and animator 
Arthur Frackenpohl – Professor Emeritus
Donald George - American operatic tenor
Dan Graser - soprano saxophonist Sinta Quartet, Professor of Saxophone Grand Valley State University
Marilyn Klerx-Hardie (1968 and 1974) – violist, Radio Filharmonisch Orkest Holland, retired
Margaret Lattimore (1991) – operatic mezzo-soprano
Brock McElheran – Professor Emeritus
Barton McLean – composer
John O'Reilly (composer)
Thomas H. Palmatier – Commander and Leader of the US Army Band "Pershing's Own"
:de:David Pittman-Jennings - American opera singer
Dimitri Pittas (1999) – operatic tenor
Paul A. Steinberg (1979) – composer, NUMA (New and Unusual Music Artists)
Jessica Suchy-Pilalis – harpist, Byzantine singer and composer
Paul Tynan (1998) – jazz musician and composer 
Brian Vlasak (2003 and 2004) – composer
Lisa Vroman (1979) – musical theatre The Phantom of the Opera and opera Crossover
Robert Washburn – Dean Emeritus
Paul Wyse – pianist
James Petercsak – SUNY Distinguished Teaching Professor of Percussion
Carol "Kickie" Britt – Professor Emeritus of Music Business
Jay Wanamaker – President and CEO, Roland Corporation U.S.
Emma Simon – Actress, singer, theatrical instructor

References

External links
The Crane School of Music
Community Performance Series (CPS)
Crane Opera Ensemble

Music schools in New York (state)
Educational institutions established in 1886
Tourist attractions in St. Lawrence County, New York
Universities and colleges in St. Lawrence County, New York
1886 establishments in New York (state)
New York
Musical groups from New York (state)